ITE College West (ITECW) is a post-secondary education institution and statutory board under the purview of the Ministry of Education in Singapore.

It is one of the Institute of Technical Education's three colleges under the "One ITE System, Three Colleges" Governance and Education Model.

Campus
In July 2010, a 9.54-hectare mega-campus was opened, operating four schools - the School of Business and Services, School of Hospitality, School of Engineering and School of Info-Comm Technology. 

The campus, which was built by Gammon Construction under a PPP contract, was officially opened on 18 April 2011 by Prime Minister Lee Hsien Loong.

Activities 
Students can participate in many co-curricular activities (CCA) organised by Clubs, Committees, and community service societies. Actively contributing in the CCA can help to attain a 'CCA bonus point' of 0.2, 0.15, 0.1 and 0.05 respectively, where it can help ITE graduates who are progressing to ITE Higher Nitec or Polytechnic diploma courses.

Notable alumni
 Jeremy Chan – Actor of MediaCorp
 Hayley Woo – Actress of MediaCorp
 Jayley Woo – Actress of MediaCorp
 Sean Tan – Professional wrestler signed to WWE
 Cheris Lee – Actress, dancer & singer.

References

External links 

 

Institutes of Technical Education in Singapore
Educational institutions established in 2010
Education in Singapore
2010 establishments in Singapore